The TQ-15 (lit. Sky Lark 15) is a gas-generator cycle rocket engine burning liquid methane and liquid oxygen under development by Landspace. The most recent version of the TQ engine family, the TQ-15A, is intended to power the second stage of LandSpace's upgraded Zhuque-2 rocket.

History
In October 2022, the construction of a fresh batch of ZQ-2 rockets was announced by LandSpace. A new variant of the TQ family of engines, designated as TQ-15A, was used in the second stage. The weight of the engine was reduced by 400 kg as a result of the elimination of the TQ-11 vernier thrusters, and vectoring is now done with a thrust vector control system that can angle up to four degrees. Additionally, the thrust will be enhanced and equipped with restart capabilities for greater mission profile flexibility.

References

Rocket engines of China
Rocket engines using methane propellant
Rocket engines using the gas-generator cycle